Oedaleus infernalis is a species of band-winged grasshopper in the family Acrididae. It is found in Asia and Oceania.

References

External links

 

Oedipodinae